We Will Bury You is a comic book miniseries written by brother–sister team Brea Grant and Zane Grant. The first issue was published in the United States on February 24, 2010. The fourth and final issue was published in June 2010.

Plot 
We Will Bury You is a story of two lesbian lovers, Miyah and Fanya, set in a zombie-ridden alternate version of the 1920s. Unlike many zombie stories, We Will Bury You does not focus on the main characters’ struggle to survive when besieged by a horde of zombies. Instead, the story concentrates on the lovers' relationship and their travels as the roles of women in society change.

References

External links 
Official interview by publisher

2010 comics endings
IDW Publishing titles
Comics set in the 1920s
Lesbian-related comics
Zombies in comics
2010s LGBT literature